Ens or ENS may refer to:

People 
 Gerhard Ens (1864–1952), Canadian politician
 Jewel Ens (1889–1950), American baseball player and coach
 Mutz Ens (1884–1950), American baseball player

Places 
 Ens, Hautes-Pyrénées, France
 Ens, Netherlands
 Ens, Saskatchewan, Canada
 Ens (river), in Bavaria, Germany

Education 
 École normale supérieure, a type of publicly funded higher education institution in France:
 École normale supérieure (Paris)
 École normale supérieure de Lyon
 École normale supérieure Paris-Saclay, in Cachan near Paris
 École normale supérieure de Rennes

Health and medicine 
 Enteric nervous system
 Empty nose syndrome
 Engineered negligible senescence

Other uses 
 Emergency notification system
 Encash Network Service, a Philippine interbank network
 EnerSys, an American battery manufacturer, NYSE symbol
 Enhanced Network Selection, a mobile telephone technology
 Ensamble Nacional del Sur, an Argentinian music ensemble
 Enschede Airport Twente, in the Netherlnads
 Ensign (rank), a junior officer rank
 Environment News Service, an American news agency
 European Nuclear Society
 Italian National Agency for the Deaf
 Ethereum Name Service